Vythilingam Palanisamy Ganesan (known as V. P. Ganesan) was a Sri Lankan trade unionist, politician, film producer and actor.

Biography

Ganeshan was the president of the trade union, Democratic Workers Congress and father of Mano, a Sri Lankan Minister and human rights defender, Praba, a former Member of Parliament, Gowri, a solicitor, Baskaran and Prakash, prominent industrialists in the hotel trade.

He produced and acted in the lead roles in three movies, Pudhiya Kattru, Naan Ungal Thozhan and Naadu Pottra Vaazhgha. As of now, he remains the only film producer to make three Tamil films in Sri Lanka and all of them were reasonable successes.

See also 
List of political families in Sri Lanka

References

External links
 
 
 IAFS
 UTHR

1999 deaths
Indian Tamil actors of Sri Lanka
Indian Tamil film producers of Sri Lanka
Indian Tamil trade unionists of Sri Lanka
Sri Lankan Hindus
Year of birth missing